The Kafkania pebble is a small rounded river pebble about  long, with Linear B symbols and a double axe symbol inscribed on it. If it were genuine, it would be the earliest writing on the Greek mainland, and by far the earliest document in Linear B. The Kafkania Pebble would also have had to exist two or more centuries before the earliest of the Linear B Documents. However, it is in all probability a modern forgery and a hoax.

Inscription
The pebble bears a short inscription of eight syllabic signs in Linear B, possibly reading . The reverse side shows a double-axe symbol. The inscription is identified by some to be in Mycenean Greek, but that identification remains disputed. It has been suggested that such an isolated example of Linear B script indicates, at best, an early stage of Mycenaean writing at the time of origin.

G. Owens suggests that the inscription is Minoan in origin rather than Mycenaean. Then, a Minoan could have written the text for a Mycenaean. No evidence exists that the Mycenaean Greeks wrote before the Linear B archive of Knossos.

Forgery

Several specialists in Mycenaean epigraphy have expressed serious doubts about the authenticity of the inscription; indications that it is a modern forgery include:

 Inscriptions on pebbles are otherwise unknown in Mycenaean and Minoan epigraphy.
 The "rays" surrounding the axe have no parallels in Mycenaean or Minoan iconography.
 Most of the symbols are "carefully executed" but one appears to be a "random graffito".
 Its context, imbedded in a wall, is peculiar and unprecedented.
 Linear B is otherwise consistently written left-to-right, but the inscription is apparently written in boustrophedon.
 The writing style appears anachronistic.
 It is unlikely on historical grounds that Linear B writing then existed in the northwest Peloponnese.
 Finally, the pebble was apparently discovered on the morning of April Fool's Day. If it is indeed a forgery, the symbols spelling a-so-na may spell out the name Iasonas, the first name of the son of Xeni Arapojanni and Jörg Rambach, the alleged discoverers of the pebble.

See also
Psychro or Epioi inscription, a modern forgery involving characters resembling Linear A characters

References

Sources

External links
Bryn Mawr Classical Review 2005.01.20 - Panos Valavanis, Games and Sanctuaries in Ancient Greece

1994 archaeological discoveries
1994 hoaxes
Archaeological artifacts
Archaeological forgeries
Inscriptions of disputed origin
Mycenaean Greek inscriptions
Stone objects